Juan Kely Guerrón Vasquez (born 21 October 1983) is an Ecuadorian footballer currently playing for Deportivo Quito in the Ecuadorian Segunda Categoría.

Club career
Guerrón started playing football professionally with ESPOLI in 2002. He played 33 games for them but did not score any goals. In 2004, he was signed by El Nacional, where he did not play many games. He managed to play 9 games in total for Nacional.

After an unsuccessful season with the military club, he signed for nearby city rivals, LDU Quito. Guerrón played more games for Liga than he did for Nacional but he still was limited for the bench. After Liga, he played for Macará, Olmedo, and Deportivo Cuenca. In Cuenca, he scored his first goal in a 3-4 win against El Nacional.

Personal life
Guerron is the half-brother of Raúl Guerrón and Copa Libertadores 2008 best player and champion Joffre Guerrón, who has represented Ecuador national football team.

References

FEF Player Card

1983 births
Living people
Association football fullbacks
Ecuadorian footballers
C.D. ESPOLI footballers
C.D. El Nacional footballers
L.D.U. Quito footballers
C.S.D. Macará footballers
C.D. Olmedo footballers
C.D. Cuenca footballers
L.D.U. Loja footballers
Imbabura S.C. footballers
S.D. Quito footballers